The Phoenix Concert Theatre is a nightclub and concert venue located at 410 Sherbourne Street in Toronto, Ontario, Canada.

It is  large and encompasses three distinct environments. The "Main Room" features one of the city's largest dance floors, leading edge sound and light, five bars (including a  marble bar), 20x30 foot stage, a giant projection screen and one of the largest mirror balls in Canada.

"Le Loft" overlooks the main room, features an overhanging balcony which stretches the entire width of the club, lounge seating for over 100, and its own separate bar, custom artwork, and two television screens. The "Parlour" is reachable from the main room and the front entrance, features a separate sound system, a separate dancefloor and lighting system, a decorative bar, lounge seating and four pool tables.

History 
The building originally served as the German-Canadian Club Harmonie, a rental venue for community gatherings, oom-pah bands, and ballroom dancing.

By the early 1980s, the venue caught the eye of veteran New York City-based hospitality entrepreneur Pat Kenny a.k.a. "The Bard of Bleecker Street" who at the time had a stake in three well known Manhattan nightclubs — The Bitter End and Kenny's Castaways in Greenwich Village as well as the Cat Club, considered by some to be the epicentre of the 1980s NYC glam metal scene. After being alerted to Toronto's Club Harmonie by friends at the Village Gate, New York City venue that doubled as nightclub and dinner theatre, Kenny opened an offshoot location of the Village Gate in Toronto with Club Harmonie still holding court in a small space within the building. After a few unsuccessful productions, the dinner theatre folded, and Kenny began renting the entire building to open a nightclub.

The Diamond
In early summer 1984, The Diamond Club took over the premises. Initially open Thursdays through Saturdays, and modelled on the Cat Club, it was overseen day-to-day by Randy Charlton whom Kenny got to run the newly launched club, hiring Charlton away from Sparkles discothèque at the top of the CN Tower having originally gone to Sparkles with the intent of luring its weekend resident DJ, Paul Cohen, over to the Diamond. Simultaneously, a staff of some fifty individuals had also been hired to work under the Diamond's general manager Charlton, developing and maintaining a theatrical, versatile venue with high-quality sound and lighting. Reflecting the ambiance of Kenny's New York clubs, the Diamond's interior stood out on Toronto's nightclub scene, differing significantly from the standard brass-and-mirrors decor of numerous clubs in the city at the time.

During its first year of operation, the Diamond functioned just as a dance club with concerts held only occasionally. Food was served in a restaurant located at the back of the club, in a room that became known as The Grapevine.

References

External links 
Phoenix Concert Theatre website
"Why We Love The Phoenix" from The Culturatti

Music venues in Toronto
Nightclubs in Toronto